Brave and Cruel and Other Stories is the third book by the English author and painter Denton Welch. A collection of short stories, it was the last publication he worked on.

It was issued by Hamish Hamilton with a publication date of 1948, but was released in January 1949, a few days after Welch's death. It consists of the title story, virtually a novella, and by far Welch's longest completed exercise in the form, and nine other much shorter stories.

Background
The idea for a collection of short stories had originated in 1944, when Hamish Hamilton had contacted Welch with a view to publishing some of the work that had already appeared in magazines and journals, along with unpublished pieces. However at that stage he did not have enough completed work to submit. In 1947 an attempt to interest his contracted publisher, Routledge, in nine short stories, ended in rejection, and mindful of the earlier approach, Welch returned to Hamish Hamilton. Hamilton's first inclination was to ask for the autobiographical novel he was working on (later to be published as A Voice Through a Cloud) but Welch demurred, feeling that (for health reasons in part) he would not be able to complete the novel in a reasonable timescale. Of the ten stories Welch offered, six had already been published (see below), one was being written and three were completed but unpublished. One of these three Welch had selected as the title of the collection, but it was this one which caused Hamilton some concern.

The short story "Brave and Cruel" concerns a wayward, charismatic character called Micki Beaumont, and his arrival into the lives of a group of middle-class friends. In particular, the story focuses on his relationship with the daughter of one of them, which appears to be leading to a deeply ill-advised marriage. Hamilton's concern stemmed from the fact that, as with almost all of Welch's stories, it was based on an actual event, and a recent one at that. Welch had, in fact, recorded most of what would become the structure of the story in his journal for August and September 1943. However, after asking Welch to make a few minor textual changes, Hamilton was satisfied the story was not actionable, despite the fact that some of the characters' actions appear gullible and foolish.

Of the other stories, in autobiographical terms, "The Coffin on the Hill", "Narcissus Bay" and "At Sea" recall Welch's childhood in China, "The Barn" is set in his school holidays in England (part of this story appears in his unfinished autobiography I Can Remember), "When I Was Thirteen" and "The Trout Stream" would appear to be roughly contemporaneous in setting, "The Judas Tree" is set in his art school years, and "Leaves from a Young Person's Notebook" is set in the first half of 1939. "The Fire in the Wood" is (narratively) entirely fictional, written in the third person, and is the only story which features a female, called "Mary", as the principal character. Even here, however, the story appears rooted to some degree in an actual experience: "Jim", the woodman with whom Mary has a brief relationship, appears in the journals as Tom. In 1941 Welch had stated in a letter to his friend Marcus Oliver, "I've been having a romantic affair with a woodman."

Contents
The Coffin on the Hill
The Barn (first published in New Writing and Daylight, Winter 1943/44)
Narcissus Bay (first published in The Cornhill Magazine, July 1945)
At Sea (first published in English Story, Fifth Series, ed. Woodrow Wyatt 1944)
When I Was Thirteen (first published in Horizon, April 1944)
The Judas Tree (first published in Penguin New Writing 26, ed. John Lehmann 1945)
The Trout Stream (first published in The Cornhill Magazine, Spring 1948)
Leaves from a Young Person's Notebook
Brave and Cruel
The Fire in the Wood

Critical response
Edith Sitwell considered the story "Brave and Cruel" to be "extraordinary". Writing in The Guardian, Harold Brighouse stated that, taken as a whole, "[t]hese stories impress not by profundity but by precision." Anthony Powell, writing in The Times Literary Supplement, found Micki's fantasies "well indicated; but one feels that more 'bite' is required in the telling". Given the publication date—nine days after Welch's death—Powell can be forgiven for the unwittingly poignant conclusion to his review:... if Mr Welch can remain severely objective, he has a talent to be developed.

In a review in The Spectator two weeks later, Olivia Manning struck a similar note, this time intentionally:

One is saddened... to note in the development of his work from its early self-absorption to an understanding of and sympathy with odd and difficult characters like the hero of the title story—new powers and a promise that cannot now be fulfilled.

In his 1974 analysis, Robert Phillips stated that the collection included some "of Welch's most remarkable achievements" and that it "deserves to be reprinted and made available again."

References

1948 short story collections
British short story collections
Books published posthumously
Hamish Hamilton books